Wanda Syahputra (born 9 January 1994) is an Indonesian professional footballer who last played as a defender for Liga 3 club Bandung United.

International career
In 2010, Wanda represented the Indonesia U-16, in the 2010 AFC U-16 Championship.

Honours

Club
PSMS Medan
 Liga 2 runner-up: 2017

References

External links
 Wanda Syahputra at Liga Indonesia
 Wanda Syahputra at Soccerway

1994 births
Living people
Indonesian footballers
PSMS Medan players
PS TIRA players
Liga 1 (Indonesia) players
Association football defenders
People from Langkat Regency
Sportspeople from North Sumatra
21st-century Indonesian people